The British Independent Film Award for British Short Film is an annual award given by the British Independent Film Awards (BIFA) to recognize the best British short film. The award was first presented in the 2003 ceremony.

Winners and nominees

2000s

2010s

2020s

See also
 BAFTA Award for Best Short Film
 Academy Award for Best Live Action Short Film

References

External links
 Official website

British Independent Film Awards
Short film awards